Galloisiana sinensis is a species of insect in the family Grylloblattidae. Its type locality is Changbaishan in Jilin, northeastern China.

References

Grylloblattidae
Insects of China